Bard Zard (also known as Bazūd) is a village in Khafri Rural District, in the Central District of Sepidan County, Fars Province, Iran. At the time of the 2006 census, 49 families lived in the village, totaling a population of 199.

References 

Populated places in Sepidan County